African Rifles may refer to:

 The King's African Rifles (KAR), a multi-battalion British colonial regiment raised from the various British possessions in East Africa, created in 1902
The East African Rifles, a British unit created in 1895 that was later merged into the KAR in 1902 
The East African Mounted Rifles, a volunteer unit of white Africans during the First World War, created in 1914
 The Rhodesian African Rifles or (RAR), the oldest regiment in the Rhodesian Army, created in 1940
The Royal African Rifles, a 1953 adventure film